Wing Chun (Chinese: 詠春) is a 2006 TVB TV series starring Nicholas Tse. The series concluded filming in 2007. It featured actors Nicholas Tse, Yuen Biao, Anson Leung, Ji Chunhua, Sammo Hung and his youngest son, Sammy Hung.

Plot
The story revolved around the elderly Leung Jan and his life in Foshan during the late Qing dynasty. The show follows the life of Leung Bik, the eager but impulsive son of Leung Jan, the local doctor and martial art master. The father and son clash head frequently as Leung Bik desires to learn martial arts but his father wants him to study medicine like his brother Leung Chun. On the other end, there is Ko Ming a poor disciple of a drunken master who has traveled all the way to Fo Shan to find his long lost sister. Leung Bik and Ko Ming become rivals when Leung wrongfully but not intentionally harms the sister and Ko Ming ends up working for a corrupt family, the Longs.

The characters grow as the innocent Ko Ming gets corrupted by pragmatic evil and is put through trial and tribulation that eventually numbs him and Leung learns responsibility when he runs to Hong Kong after being accused of murder. Complex characters set against love triangles and the adventures of other supporting characters brings this classic show to live.

Cast

International broadcast

References

Hong Kong television shows
2006 Hong Kong television series debuts
2007 Hong Kong television series endings